In the mathematical field of functional analysis, the Eberlein–Šmulian theorem (named after William Frederick Eberlein and Witold Lwowitsch Schmulian) is a result that relates three different kinds of weak compactness in a Banach space.

Statement 

Eberlein–Šmulian theorem:  If X is a Banach space and A is a subset of X, then the following statements are equivalent: 
 each sequence of elements of A has a subsequence that is weakly convergent in X
 each sequence of elements of A has a weak cluster point in X
 the weak closure of A is weakly compact.

A set A can be weakly compact in three different ways: 
 Sequential compactness: Every sequence from A has a convergent subsequence whose limit is in A.
 Limit point compactness: Every infinite subset of A has a limit point in A.
 Compactness (or Heine-Borel compactness):  Every open cover of A admits a finite subcover.
The Eberlein–Šmulian theorem states that the three are equivalent on a weak topology of a Banach space. 
While this equivalence is true in general for a metric space, the weak topology is not metrizable in infinite dimensional vector spaces, and so the Eberlein–Šmulian theorem is needed.

Applications 
The Eberlein–Šmulian theorem is important in the theory of PDEs, and particularly in Sobolev spaces. Many Sobolev spaces are reflexive Banach spaces and therefore bounded subsets are weakly precompact by Alaoglu's theorem. Thus the theorem implies that bounded subsets are weakly sequentially precompact, and therefore from every bounded sequence of elements of that space it is possible to extract a subsequence which is weakly converging in the space. Since many PDEs only have solutions in the weak sense, this theorem is an important step in deciding which spaces of weak solutions to use in solving a PDE.

See also
Banach–Alaoglu theorem
Bishop–Phelps theorem
Mazur's lemma
James' theorem
Goldstine theorem

References

Bibliography 

 
 .
 .
 .

Banach spaces
Compactness theorems
Theorems in functional analysis